The 2014 Stony Brook Seawolves football team represented Stony Brook University in the 2014 NCAA Division I FCS football season. The Seawolves competed as second year members of the Colonial Athletic Association with Chuck Priore as the head coach for his ninth season. They played their home games at Kenneth P. LaValle Stadium in Stony Brook, New York. They finished the season 5–7, 4–4 in CAA play to finish in a four-way tie for fifth place.

Previous season
Stony Brook joined the Colonial  Athletic Association for the 2013 season together with their State University of New York rival Albany Great Danes. After a strong start beating Rhode Island for their first CAA win, the Seawolves struggled for most of the season on the gridiron losing their next three against Buffalo, Villanova, and Towson. They bounced back in their homecoming game to beat NEC Bryant and Patriot league Colgate but fell to three straight CAA opponents, eliminating them from playoff contention after back-to-back playoff seasons. The Seawolves went on to close the 2013 season strong beating James Madison and their rival Albany in the last game of the season to finish 5–6 overall, 3–5 in the CAA.

Schedule
*Source: Schedule

References

Stony Brook
Stony Brook Seawolves football seasons
Stony Brook Seawolves football